The Iranian People's Fedai Guerrillas (IFPG), also known as the Dehghani faction after its leader Ashraf Dehghani, is an Iranian communist organization that split from the Organization of Iranian People's Fedai Guerrillas (OIFPG) in 1979, dropping the word "organization" from its name.

Dehghani broke away from the OIFPG when she accused it of deviating from the strategy of guerrilla warfare. From the early days of Iranian Revolution, the group claimed to be the "sole genuine communist organization" and opposed the Islamic Republic. Reportedly, as much as 30% of OIFPG members joined the group and fought in the 1979 Kurdish rebellion against government forces, backing the Democratic Party of Iranian Kurdistan. Surviving members of the group and its factions moved to Europe in the 1990s. Currently, IFPG publishes two publications "Payam Fadaei" and "19 Bahman" in the Persian language.

See also 
 Guerrilla groups of Iran

References

External links 
 The Iranian People's Fedai Guerrillas

Political parties of the Iranian Revolution
Communist parties in Iran
Anti-revisionist organizations
Guerrilla organizations
Militant opposition to the Islamic Republic of Iran
Banned communist parties
Banned political parties in Iran
Paramilitary organisations based in Iran
1979 establishments in Iran
Left-wing militant groups in Iran